Archbishop of Finland can refer to:

 the Evangelical Lutheran Archbishop of Turku
 the Eastern Orthodox Archbishop of Finland